Filip Braut (born 5 June 2002) is a Croatian professional footballer who plays as a right-back for Hrvatski Dragovoljac.

Club career
Born in Rijeka, Braut progressed through the youth academy of hometown club HNK Rijeka. He made his professional debut on 25 May 2019 against Slaven Belupo, on the last matchday of the 2018–19 season. He was utilised as a centre-back in the 1–1 draw. With this appearance, he became the youngest player to debut for the club at 16 years, 11 months and 20 days.

Braut signed his first professional contract on 26 February 2020. On 1 August 2020, Braut started in the Croatian Cup final against Lokomotiva Zagreb, where he won his first trophy after a 1–0 win.

International career
From 2018 to 2019, Braut represented the Croatia U17, where he won eight caps.

Career statistics

Club

Honours
Rijeka
 Croatian Cup: 2018–19, 2019–20

References

2002 births
Living people
Footballers from Rijeka
Association football defenders
Croatian footballers
Croatia youth international footballers
HNK Rijeka players
NK Hrvatski Dragovoljac players
Croatian Football League players